Georgia Babladelis (January 30, 1931 – May 28, 2009) was a female psychologist, born to Greek immigrant parents in Manistique, Michigan. Starting in the 1950s, Babladelis' work focused on creating diversity in universities and ensuring that women had a place in the workforce as well as in school environments. Babledelis studied gender and sex roles; personality development; psychotherapy; the psychology of women; and women's education. Babladelis played a major role in Division 35: Society for the Psychology of Women, which formed as a special interest group for the American Psychological Association in 1973.

Early life and education

Babladelis had a sister, Helen, and a brother, George. She remained in Michigan for much of her youth. Babladelis earned a Bachelor of Arts in Psychology from the University of Michigan in 1953. She earned her Master of Arts from the University of California at Berkeley in 1957. In 1960, she was awarded a Ph.D. in Psychology from the University of Colorado.

Career in psychology

After working at the Alameda County Juvenile Justice Center in Oakland in the early 1960s, Babladelis accepted a position as a psychology professor at California State University in 1964. She held this position until 1994. As one of the university's first female professors, Babladelis contributed to the development of Cal State's women's studies program. She created the first Psychology of women course at Cal State. She also started the university's nursing department. She was also the founding editor of Psychology of Women Quarterly, a research journal dedicated to female cognition and behavior.

Babaldelis contributed to the success of Division 35 at the American Psychological Association. This fueled her efforts to promote the psychology of women on a much larger scale. Babladelis also had the opportunity to represent the United States in the United Nations Educational, Scientific, and Cultural Organization (UNESCO).

Babledalis was a Fellow of the Society for the Psychological Study of Social Issues, a member of the Society for Personality and Social Psychology, a member of International Psychology, and a Fellow of the Association for Psychological Science and Women's Psychological Association. These professional activities helped Babladelis promote intercultural dialogue and gender equality education in professional psychology.

During the 1980s, Babladelis served as the United States Director of Research for the United Nations Educational, Scientific, and Cultural Organization (UNESCO). In this role, she promoted gender equality, intercultural dialogue, and education for all.

After she retired from teaching in 1994, Babladelis continued writing and she worked closely with the League of Women Voters. Through this work, she was able to continue promoting and supporting feminism. Babladelis also created a scholarship, named after her, to support students who return to school to complete their degrees. "This university has always been very supportive of the mature students making their way back", Babladelis said in 2005. "I’ve seen how these students, in particular, can have a more difficult time succeeding in the classroom. They’re already holding down full-time jobs while supporting their families. I’ve had first-hand contact with so many of these students, and I’ve come to admire the challenge they take on."

Psychology of Women Quarterly

Babladelis founded Psychology of Women Quarterly, a research journal dedicated to female behavior and cognition. Balbadelis wrote the following about the importance of studying not only women but also expanding the focus of psychology to populations outside the college student demographic: Not long ago worried critics warned that we psychologists were in danger of knowing a great deal about only a small segment of society, namely the college student. The research community responded effectively and has continued to expand the range and representativeness of the subject populations studied. Recently concerned critics have pointed out that the earlier problem masked an older bias in research and that most of our information about behavior is based on the study of men only. Once more scientists are responding effectively and new literature on the psychology of women is emerging. A paramount purpose of this journal is to make that literature readily available.

Professional accolades

In 1992, Babladelis was recognized as one of the "100 Outstanding Women in Psychology" during the American Psychological Association's centennial celebration. She will also be remembered as one of the founders and editors of the Psychology of Women Quarterly and the work published in the journal over the years.

Personal life

Babladelis had a passion for animals. This led her to research gorilla interaction and communication. In this research, Babladelis found that gorillas have the desire to be in family settings. This influenced the design of the San Diego Wild Animal Center's gorilla habitat. Later in life, Babladelis donated to the Center for Companion Animal Health at the School of Veterinary Medicine at the University of California, Davis.

International travel and continued activism

Babladelis enjoyed international travel, a passion she combined with her work promoting women's rights. She was interested in many different cultures. Babladelis served as the U.S. Director of Research for the UNESCO in the early 1980s. In this role, Babladelis combined her professional interest in promoting women's rights with her ability to learn about other countries and cultures.

References

Wikipedia Student Program
1931 births
2009 deaths
American women psychologists
University of Michigan alumni
University of California, Berkeley alumni
University of Colorado alumni
American women academics
People from Schoolcraft County, Michigan